The Costa Verde (Green Coast) is a coastline located in the south west of Sardinia, in the Province of South Sardinia. It extends for 47 km from Capo Frasca, in the north, to Capo Pecora and Portixeddu, in the south. 

The toponym was initially the commercial name of the first specifically tourist settlement built in the mid-twentieth century, in the area of Portu Maga, but nowadays by extension it is used to indicate the whole coast belonging to the municipality of Arbus

Geography

Places
Particularly notable beaches, following the coast from north to south, include:

 Capo Frasca
 Pistis
 Torre dei Corsari
 Porto Palma
 Babari
 Funtanazza
 Gutturu e' Flumini
 Portu Maga,
 Piscinas
 Scivu
 Capo Pecora

See also
 Arbus, Sardinia
 Mount Arcuentu
 Montevecchio
 Province of South Sardinia

References

Footnotes

Bibliography
 Angei, Luca, Arbus tra storia e leggenda. Usanze e vita di un popolo, Cesmet, Napoli, 1995
 Caddeo, Antonello, Arbus. Immagini e ricordi dal passato, Editar, Cagliari, 1994
 Concas, Luciano, Arbus, coste incantate e fondali da sogno, Garau, Guspini 2007
 Concas, Luciano, Arbus, le sue coste e i suoi fondali, Garau, Guspini 2003
 Mostallino Murgia, Costa Verde. Da Capo Frasca a Cala Domestica. La costa e l'interno, Zonza, Cagliari, 2005

External links
 Official Website of the Medio Campidano Province (in English)
 www.CostaVerde.eu - Information about Costa Verde place (in English)

Coasts of Italy
Landforms of Sardinia
Province of South Sardinia